Helen Wiggins (born Ellen Matilda Wiggins) was a British film editor active from the 1930s through to the 1970s.

Biography 
Helen was the daughter of Jack Wiggins, a pioneering British cameraman. She followed in her father's footsteps as she grew up, gaining employment in processing laboratories and eventually becoming an editor for The National News, a colour newsreel.

She worked for Pathé News for several years, becoming its chief editor by 1940, after which she left to form her own company, Helen Wiggins Ltd. As a freelancer, she worked on many features, shorts, documentaries, and commercials during the 1940s through the 1950s.

Selected filmography 
 The Gorbals Story (1950)
 The Third Visitor (1951)
 Worm's Eye View (1951)
 Take Me to Paris (1951)
 King of the Underworld (1952)
 Murder at Scotland Yard (1952)
 Little Big Shot (1952)
 Tim Driscoll's Donkey (1955)
 The Devil's Pass (1957)
 Not Wanted on Voyage (1957)
 Insomnia Is Good for You (1957)
 Up the Creek (1958)
 Nature's Paradise (1959)
 Mrs. Gibbons' Boys (1962)
 Don't Talk to Strange Men (1962)

References

External links 
 

British film editors
British women film editors
Year of birth missing
Year of death missing